Janet Louise Jeanblanc Adams (born August 30, 1937) is an American politician.

Early life 
Adams was born on August 30, 1937, in Webster County, Iowa. She is the eldest child of Wilbur and Verda Jeanblanc and has a younger brother and sister, Donald and Joyce. She attended Eagle Grove High School, Eagle Grove Community College and Buena Vista College. After completing her studies in 1957, Jeanblanc married Ron Adams. They raised seven children. Janet Adams became a teacher.

Political career 
Politically, she was active as board member and president of the Iowa League of Women Voters, served on the school board of the Archdiocese of Dubuque, and sat on the Hamilton County Democratic Central Committee. She represented the Democratic Party and District 14 of the Iowa House of Representatives from 1987 to 1993.

References

1937 births
Living people
Democratic Party members of the Iowa House of Representatives
20th-century American women politicians
20th-century American women educators
20th-century American politicians
Schoolteachers from Iowa
20th-century American educators
People from Hamilton County, Iowa
People from Webster County, Iowa
Buena Vista University alumni
School board members in Iowa